Labrys soli is a Gram-negative, strictly aerobic, non-motile, non-spore-forming bacteria from the family Xanthobacteraceae which has been isolated from the rhizosphere of a ginseng plant.

References

Further reading 
 

Hyphomicrobiales
Bacteria described in 2015